Weakley County is a county located in the northwest of the U.S. state of Tennessee. As of the 2020 census, the population was 32,902. Its county seat is Dresden. Its largest city is Martin, the home of the University of Tennessee at Martin. The county was established by the Tennessee General Assembly on October 21, 1823, and is named for U.S. Congressman Robert Weakley (1764–1845). Weakley County comprises the Martin, TN Micropolitan Statistical Area.

History
Weakley County was created in October 1823 from some of the land that the Chickasaw people ceded to the United States in the Treaty of 1818. The county was named after Colonel Robert Weakley, a member of the House of Representatives, a speaker of the State Senate, and the man commissioned to treat (negotiate) with the Chickasaw.

During the 19th century, the county was the state's largest corn producer. By the latter half of the 20th century, soybeans became the county's leading crop.

Geography
The North Fork of the Obion River flows through the northern half of the county, the Middle Fork flows across the central portion of the county, and the South Fork flows across the southern part of the county. The Obion is a tributary of the Mississippi River.

Adjacent counties
Hickman County, Kentucky (northwest)
Graves County, Kentucky (north)
Henry County (east)
Carroll County (southeast)
Gibson County (southwest)
Obion County (west)

State protected areas
Bean Switch Refuge
Big Cypress Tree State Natural Area
Big Cypress Tree State Park
Harts Mill Wetland Wildlife Management Area (part)
Obion River Wildlife Management Area (part)

Demographics

2020 census

As of the 2020 United States census, there were 32,902 people, 13,640 households, and 8,677 families residing in the county.

2000 census
As of the census of 2000, there were 34,895 people, 13,599 households, and 9,124 families residing in the county. The population density was 60 people per square mile (23/km2). There were 14,928 housing units at an average density of 26 per square mile (10/km2). The racial makeup of the county was 90.27% White, 6.95% Black or African American, 0.15% Native American, 1.32% Asian, 0.01% Pacific Islander, 0.52% from other races, and 0.78% from two or more races. 1.15% of the population were Hispanic or Latino of any race.

There were 13,599 households, out of which 29.40% had children under the age of 18 living with them, 54.20% were married couples living together, 9.50% had a female householder with no husband present, and 32.90% were non-families. 27.00% of all households were made up of individuals, and 11.50% had someone living alone who was 65 years of age or older. The average household size was 2.38 and the average family size was 2.89.

The population was spread out, with 21.60% under the age of 18, 15.90% from 18 to 24, 26.10% from 25 to 44, 21.90% from 45 to 64, and 14.50% who were 65 years of age or older.  The median age was 35 years. For every 100 females there were 94.20 males. For every 100 females age 18 and over, there were 91.10 males.

The median income for a household in the county was $30,008, and the median income for a family was $38,658. Males had a median income of $28,597 versus $20,845 for females. The per capita income for the county was $15,408. About 11.10% of families and 16.00% of the population were below the poverty line, including 16.80% of those under age 18 and 16.20% of those age 65 or over.

Media

Radio
WWGY 99.3 "Today's Best Music with "Ace & TJ in the Morning"
WRQR-FM 105.5 "Today's Best Music with "Ace & TJ in the Morning"
WENK-AM 1240 "The Greatest Hits of All Time"
WTPR-AM 710 "The Greatest Hits of All Time"
WTPR-FM 101.7 "The Greatest Hits of All Time"
 WCMT-AM 1410 100.5FM   
 WCMT-FM 101.3
 WUTM-FM 90.3
(WCDZ FM 95.1 and 102.9FM)  
 WCMT-AM 1410 "your best friend"

Print
Dresden Enterprise - located in Dresden, the county seat.
The Weakley County Press - located in Martin
The Pacer - Student newspaper of the University of Tennessee at Martin

Education

Weakley County Schools
School District website - http://www.weakleyschools.com/

Communities

Cities
Greenfield
Martin
McKenzie (mostly in Carroll County and a small portion in Henry County)

Towns
Dresden (county seat)
Gleason
Sharon

Unincorporated communities
 Austin Springs
 Boydsville
Dukedom (partial)
Gardner
Latham
Palmersville

Politics

See also
 National Register of Historic Places listings in Weakley County, Tennessee

References

External links

Official site
Weakley County Chamber of Commerce
Weakley County Schools
Weakley County TNGenWeb

 
1823 establishments in Tennessee
Populated places established in 1823
West Tennessee